The Army of the Kingdom of Naples was, by the time's standards, a relatively sizeable force. At its height in 1815, it numbered close to 95,000 men. This large formation was modelled heavily on the French Grande Armée, and although the success of its service in the Peninsular War is questionable, the Neapolitan Army is still remembered as one of the better-organised examples of armies from Napoleon's client states.

Below is a mostly complete (with a few obscure exceptions) list of various units serving in the Murattian Neapolitan Army in the Napoleonic Wars. The units are listed by their respective army branches, i.e. Guard infantry and engineers. It must be noted that all of the regiments and units pertaining to the Guard had the phrase "della Guardia Reale" (Italian: 'of the Royal Guard') after their official name, to indicate their status as part of the Royal Household Guard.

Royal Guard

Guard Infantry 
In 1815, the Guard Infantry Division totalled 57 companies organised into 4 regiments (9 battalions) and totalled 8,135 men.

Guard Cavalry

Supporting Arms

Cavalry of the Line 
During the 1813 reorganisation of the Neapolitan Army, the light cavalry were converted to line cavalry.

Light Cavalry

Infantry of the Line

Line Infantry

Light Infantry

Reserve Units
In 1815, the Army of the Reserve numbered 91 companies split into various gendarmerie and police legions and units.

Provincial Infantry

Royal Gendarmerie

Provincial Legions

Provisional Units

Supporting Arms

Artillery

Artillery Train & Supply

Engineers & Miners

Internal Security Guard

References 

 
 
 
V. Ilari, P. Crociani, G. Boeri, Storia Militare del Regno Murattiano 1806-15, Widerholdt Frères, Invorio, 2007, vol. I (Comando e Amministrazione), II (Armi e Corpi dell'Esercito), III (Gendarmeria, Legioni Provinciali, Marina, Indice biografico).
Virgilio Ilari, Piero Crociani e Ciro Paoletti, Storia militare dell'Italia giacobina (1796-1801), Roma, USSME, 2000, II ("La guerra Peninsulare": «Il nuovo esercito napoletano, 1799-1802», pp. 1131–1153; «I francesi sulle coste italiane, 1800-02», pp. 1155–1173).
Smith, Digby (1998). The Greenhill Napoleonic wars data book. London Mechanicsburg, PA: Greenhill Books Stackpole Books. . OCLC 37616149.
 Smith, Digby (2006). An illustrated encyclopedia of uniforms of the Napoleonic wars : an expert, in-depth reference to the officers and soldiers of the revolutionary and Napoleonic period, 1792-1815. London Lanham, Md: Lorenz North American agent/distributor, National Book Network. . OCLC 60320422.

Kingdom of Naples (Napoleonic)
Armies of Napoleonic Wars